TUKO.co.ke is a Kenyan online newspaper and entertainment website that features aggregated, exclusive and users’ generated news content.

History and character 
Founded in 2014, TUKO.co.ke has its headquarters in Nairobi and is a partner of Genesis Media global consumer Internet company which also cooperates with Legit.ng (in Nigeria), Briefly (in SouthAfrica) and YEN.com.gh (in Ghana) .

The site features a selection of "trending local news, viral content and entertainment" with which it attracts a number of readers across the country who don't have the patience for traditional news outlets.

Meaning of name 
The name "TUKO" is translated from Swahili language as "we are here", or " we are there" or simply "We are", at least according to The Guide Kenya.

Popularity 
In January 2017 TUKO.co.ke became the number one news and entertainment website barely two years after being set up, beating Nation and Standard Media Group.

As of October 2017, TUKO.co.ke has more than 1.7 million website users. Currently the website's Facebook community is almost 6 million fans. The website TUKO.co.ke has more than 20 categories of news which helps to attract diverse audience.

TUKO.co.ke also exists on Android applications.

References 

Kenyan news websites
Internet properties established in 2015
2015 establishments in Kenya